Raymond Ruaporo is a former professional rugby league and rugby union footballer who played in the 2000s, and 2010s. He played representative level rugby league (RL) for Cook Islands, and at club level for the Canberra Raiders, and club level rugby union (RU) for the Tuggeranong Vikings.

Rugby league career
Ruaporo won a cap for Cook Islands (RL) in the 2000 Rugby League World Cup.

In 2001 he played for the Canberra Raiders Jersey Flegg side.

Later years
As of 2009, Ruaporo plays rugby union in the New South Wales lower grades, spending 2009 with the Tuggeranong Vikings.

References

External links

Cook Island rugby league players
Cook Island rugby union players
Cook Islands national rugby league team players
Living people
Place of birth missing (living people)
Year of birth missing (living people)
Cook Island expatriate rugby union players
Expatriate rugby union players in Australia
Cook Island expatriates in Australia